America's Next Top Model, cycle 1 was the first cycle of America's Next Top Model. It originally aired on UPN from May to July 2003, and was hosted by Tyra Banks, who additionally served as its executive producer and presenter. The judging panel consisted of Banks, Janice Dickinson, Kimora Lee Simmons, and Beau Quillian. The cycle's catchphrase was "One girl has what it takes."

This was the only season to feature a cast of only ten finalists. All later cycles have featured at least twelve finalists. The international destination for the cycle was Paris, France. The show’s first visit to Europe.

The winner of the competition was 20-year-old Adrianne Curry from Joliet, Illinois with Shannon Stewart placing as runner up. Her prizes were a modeling contract with Wilhelmina Models, a photo spread in Marie Claire magazine, and a contract with Revlon cosmetics.

Contestants
(Ages stated are at start of contest)

Episodes

Summaries

Call-out order

 The contestant was not included in the casting call-out order but was additionally added to the cast
 The contestant was eliminated
 The contestant won the competition

Average call-out order
Casting call-out order and final two are not included.

Bottom two

 The contestant was eliminated after her first time in the bottom two
 The contestant was eliminated after her second time in the bottom two
 The contestant was eliminated in the final judging and placed as the runner-up

Photo shoot guide
Episode 1 photo shoot: Swimwear on a rooftop
Episode 2 photo shoot: Swimwear for Stuff magazine
Episode 3 photo shoot: Beauty shots with snakes
Episode 4 commercial: Fresh Look contact lenses
Episode 5 photo shoot: Reebok ad with Clinton Portis
Episode 6 photo shoot: Wonder Bra overlooking the Eiffel Tower
Episode 7 photo shoots: Nude campaign for Merit Diamond

Makeovers
 Nicole - Extensions trimmed and straightened
 Ebony - Tuft shaved off
 Giselle - Layered and dyed red
 Kesse - Long honey blonde extensions
 Robin - Light brown extensions
 Elyse - Pixie cut
 Shannon - Long blonde extensions
 Adrianne - Weave with bangs

Critical reception

Cycle 1 has received positive reviews from critics. Despite its low budget, E. Alex Jung commented how this worked to the show's advantage, praising how Tyra “wanted to reflect the reality of life as a working model” and acknowledging that “there was something about the low production value that reflected that simple truth.” He also praised it in comparison to other seasons of America's Next Top Model, commentening how “ANTM’s first season felt like a glimpse into how fashion actually worked” whereas later seasons “became campier, more ludicrous, and vaguely surreal.” Jung also states that Cycle 1 “was the only season where the contestants didn’t readily buy into the project” and commended the season for respecting their decisions, such as when Shannon and Robin refused to pose nude.

Margaret Lyons also praised the season, describing it as “impeachable” and “one of the best seasons, debut or otherwise, that any reality show has ever had.” She argued that “ANTM helped usher in the era of profession-based reality contest shows” but viewed it more positively compared to the rest of America's Next Top Models seasons, commenting how “nothing has ever quite lived up to the perfection of season one” and how “the grossness of Tyra’s constant idiotic catchphrases, and the repetitiveness of the challenges (have) eventually eroded my passion for the series.”

Post–Top Model careersTessa Carlson modeled for Noah Kalina and Joey Quintero.Katie Cleary has worked with Deal or No Deal and has done print modeling. She has been an on-camera host for TV Guide Channel, E! News, and HDTV's Get Out. Her acting credits include How to Get Away with Murder, Chuck, The Break-Up, The Lake House, and Iron Man 2.Adrianne Curry  although not receiving her contracts Revlon and Wilhelmina, she has still modelled for several magazines, including Life & Style Weekly, Us Weekly, Star, OK!, Stuff, People, Maxim, made the Maxim Hot 100 list in 2005, Max (Spanish), Marie Claire and Spanish Marie Claire. She shot campaigns for Von Dutch, Von Dutch Watches, Salon City, Macy's, Famous Stars and Straps, Lucky, Ed Hardy, Kinis Bikinis, Beverly Hills Choppers and Merit Diamonds. She has walked for Jaime Pressly and Pamela Anderson. Curry was signed with Wilhelmina Models and Avenue Modeller, and is no longer a model. She was married to actor Christopher Knight from 2006 to 2012.Ebony Haith was signed with Downtown Model Management.Robin Manning is pursuing an acting career and has been in two movies, and has done church-related print work.Nicole Panattoni modeled for various companies. She is married to BMX rider Cory Nastazio.Giselle Samson now works as a hostess for Carnival Cruise.Elyse Sewell signed with multiple agencies in Asia and later graced the cover of Harper's Bazaar Hong Kong.Shannon Stewart''' has done print work for Bakers Shoes, Dillards and Speedo Aquatic Fitness Line. She has been signed with Ford Models and Elite Model Management. She participated in the America's Next Top Model'' All Stars cycle alongside other former contestants, finishing in sixth place.

Trivia

 In an Instagram livestream, Jay Manuel revealed that Cycle 1 had such a low budget, that he was the one on the computer, throwing the photos up onto the screen during panel.

 Manuel also revealed that during the filming of episode 7, when the black and white photos that Tyra Banks shot came up on the screen before panel, Janice Dickinson said “Who shot these photos?! They’re horrible!“.

Controversies

After winning Cycle 1, Adrianne Curry was meant to receive a contract with Revlon and Wilhelmina Models, but she never received it. America's Next Top Model and Tyra Banks ignored her when she contacted them about the issue, and Curry was subsequently erased from the show. Although she appeared on Cycle 2, and was briefly mentioned in Cycle 20 as part of a challenge, she wasn’t featured in the opening credits for Cycles 7, 8 or 9 alongside the other previous winners of America's Next Top Model, and a photo of her didn’t appear in the contestants’ New York residence alongside the previous Top Model winners.

References

External links
 

A01
2003 American television seasons
Television shows filmed in New York City
Television shows filmed in France